The Hutt by-election 1856 was a by-election held in the multi-member  electorate during the 2nd New Zealand Parliament, on 27 November 1856.

The by-election was caused by the resignation of incumbent MP Alfred Ludlam and was won by Samuel Revans. On nomination day (26 November) Samuel Revans and George Hart were nominated, and after a show of hands in favour of Revans, Hart demanded a poll. Samuel Revans was subsequently elected the following day.

Results

References

Hutt 1856
1856 elections in New Zealand
Politics of the Wellington Region